The Łoś–Tarski theorem is a theorem in model theory, a branch of mathematics, that states that the set of formulas preserved under taking substructures is exactly the set of universal formulas. The theorem was discovered by Jerzy Łoś and Alfred Tarski.

Statement 

Let  be a theory in a first-order language  and 
(The sequence of variables  need not be
finite.) Then the following are equivalent:
If , then .( is preserved in substructures for models of )

A formula is  if and only if it is of the form  where  is quantifier-free.

In more common terms, this states that
As substructures and embeddings are dual notions, this theorem is sometimes stated in its dual form:

Note that this property fails for finite models.

Citations

References 

Model theory
Metalogic